Clephane  is a surname. Notable people with the surname include:

Elizabeth C. Clephane (1830–1869), Scottish hymn writer
James O. Clephane (1842–1910), American court reporter and venture capitalist
James Clephane-Cameron (1985-), English poet
John Clephane (died 1758), Scottish physician
Neil Clephane-Cameron (1960-), English historian

See also
Clephane-Cameron, a surname